The 2006–07 season was the 107th season in Società Sportiva Lazio's history and their 19th consecutive season in the top-flight of Italian football.

Squad

Formation

Goalscorers

Serie A
  Tommaso Rocchi 16 (3)
  Goran Pandev 11
  Stefano Mauri 6
  Massimo Oddo 5 (3)
  Stephen Ayodele Makinwa 3
  Sebastiano Siviglia 3
  Luis Jiménez 2
  Cristian Ledesma 2
  Christian Manfredini 2
  Massimo Mutarelli 2
  Valon Behrami 1
  Manuel Belleri 1
  Emílson Sánchez Cribari 1
  Pasquale Foggia 1

Coppa Italia
  Goran Pandev 3
  Tommaso Rocchi 3
  Lorenzo De Silvestri 1
  Luciano Zauri 1

Serie A

League table

Matches

Sources
  RSSSF – Italy 2006/07

S.S. Lazio seasons
Lazio